Samir Adam (born 5 December 1983) is a Mozambique basketball player currently with Fundacion Adepal Alcazar of the Spanish Professional Basketball League. He is also a member of the Mozambique national basketball team and appeared with the club at the 2009 African Championships.

References

1983 births
Living people
Mozambican men's basketball players